Events in the year 1860 in Costa Rica

Incumbents
President: José María Montealegre

Events

Births

Deaths
September 30 - Juan Rafael Mora Porras
October 2 - José María Cañas

References

1860s in Costa Rica